Charles William Grigsby, Jr. (born September 15, 1978) is an American singer-songwriter and a finalist on the second season of American Idol.

Early life
The youngest of six siblings, Grigsby was born in Oberlin, Ohio. In high school, he joined the school choir. After high school, Grigsby moved to Detroit, Michigan and enrolled in school to study computer-aided design.

American Idol
Grigsby auditioned for the second season of American Idol where he sang "Overjoyed" by Stevie Wonder in the first semi-final group and was one of two contestants from the round to automatically advance to the final 12.

In the finals he sang "How Sweet It Is (To Be Loved by You)" by Marvin Gaye and advanced to the top eleven, where he was eliminated after singing "You Can't Win" from The Wiz.

He was a part of the American Idols LIVE! Tour 2003 which ran from July 8 to August 31, where he sang "Do I Do" by Stevie Wonder.

Post-Idol
On July 21, 2005, Grigsby released, Charles Grigsby, an EP self-titled consisting of six tracks. In 2008 he joined a local band that performed across northeast Ohio. In September 2010, he then became the lead vocalist of the international band, Centric, in the Hard Rock Cafe in Pattaya, Thailand.

On September 1, 2011, Grigsby released a music download single Headliner and performed the song on WJW Fox 8 Cleveland News. A benefit concert featuring Grigsby was held at The First Church in Oberlin on September 11, 2011.

After taking vocal rest, Grigsby has returned to the music industry and released his album Hindsight on December 31, 2020 and a new single Christmas Once Again on December 1, 2022.

Discography

References

1978 births
21st-century American singers
Singers from Ohio
American Idol participants
Living people
People from Oberlin, Ohio
21st-century American male singers